USS Nashville may refer to:

, was a gunboat in service from 1897 to 1918
, was a light cruiser in service from 1938 to 1946; sold to Chile in 1951 and scrapped in 1985
, was an amphibious transport dock that served from 1970 to 2009

See also

United States Navy ship names